The Fellowship of the British Academy consists of world-leading scholars and researchers in the humanities and social sciences. A varying number of fellows are elected each year in July at the Academy's annual general meeting.

1980 
The following fellows of the British Academy were elected at the annual general meeting in 1980:
 Dr A. C. Baines
 Lord Briggs
R. A. G. Carson
M. H. Crawford
P. M. Deane
 Professor F. R. H. Du Boulay
 Professor N. Hampson
 Dr P. Hunter Blair
L. Kolakowski
 Dr C. Lewy
 Professor W. McKane
J. Mellaart
 Professor A. C. Renfrew
 Rev. Professor G. C. Stead
 Professor E. T. Stokes
 Professor R. B. Tate
 Professor J. B. Trapp
N. G. Wilson
 E. A. Wrigley
D. E. C. Yale

1981 
The following fellows of the British Academy were elected at the annual general meeting in 1981:
 Professor J. L. Ackrill
 Dr F. R. Allchin
 Professor J. A. Barnes
 Professor Averil Cameron
 Professor A. C. Graham
 Professor F. H. Hinsley
 Professor J. P. Kenyon
 Dr E. Miller
 Professor M. Morishima
 Professor D. M. Nicol
 Professor S. S. Prawer
 Dr J. R. Rea
 Professor A. L. F. Rivet
B. W. Robinson
 Professor J. D. Sargan
 Professor M. A. Screech
 Professor Q. R. D. Skinner
 Dr B. H. I. H. Stewart
 Professor Lord Wedderburn of Charlton
 Rev. Professor M. R. Wiles
D. M. Wilson

1982 
The following fellows of the British Academy were elected at the annual general meeting in 1982:
 Professor M. D. K. Baxandall
 Professor T. J. Brown
 Professor T. Burns
 Professor P. Collinson
 Rev. Professor C. E. B. Cranfield
 Professor G. E. Daniel
 J. C. R. Dow
 Professor S. E. Finer
B. F. Harvey
 Professor H. D. Jocelyn
E. L. Jones
 Professor G. H. Jones
R. C. Latham
O. W. Neighbour
 J. M. Reynolds
 Professor Dr O. J. L. Szemerényi
 Professor C. G. Thorne
 Dr C. Webster

1983 
The following fellows of the British Academy were elected at the annual general meeting in 1983:
 Dr C. F. L. Austin
 Professor C. F. Beckingham
 Professor Margaret A. Boden
 Professor D. W. Bowett
 Professor D. Ellis Evans
 Professor C. H. Feinstein
 Rev. Professor W. H. C. Frend
 Professor C. H. Gifford
 Professor P. G. Hall
D. M. G. Hirst
 Professor G. S. Holmes
M. S. F. Hood
 Sir Michael Levey
K. J. Leyser
 Dr G. E. R. Lloyd
J. H. McDowell
 D. H. Mellor
 Professor B. G. Mitchell
 Dr K. O. Morgan
 Professor A. W. B. Simpson
 Very Rev. Professor T. F. Torrance
P. M. Williams

1984 
The following fellows of the British Academy were elected at the annual general meeting in 1984:
 Professor A. B. Atkinson
 Dr J. H. Baker
 Professor K. Bourne
 Professor H. N. Bull
M. F. Burnyeat
M. R. F. Butlin
J. Campbell
 Professor W. R. Cornish
E. P. M. Dronke
 Dr G. Dudbridge
 Dr R. J. W. Evans
 Professor A. A. B. Fairlie
 J. H. Goldthorpe
 Professor F. R. D. Goodyear
 Professor F. R. Hodson
 Professor M. K. Hopkins
 Dr P. J. Jones
 Rev. Professor Canon J. Macquarrie
 Professor J. A. Mirrlees
 Professor N. G. Parker
 Professor M. D. Reeve
 N. K. Sandars
 Professor T. J. Smiley

1985 
The following fellows of the British Academy were elected at the annual general meeting in 1985:
 Dr J. J. G. Alexander
 Professor C. R. Bawden
 Professor M. W. Beresford
M. Biddle
 G. A. Cohen
 Professor S. M. Cretney
 Professor A. E. M. Davies
 Professor J. K. Davies
 Dr J. Diggle
 Dr R. A. Donkin
 Professor A. A. M. Duncan
 Professor J. Erickson
 Dr H. H. Erskine-Hill
P. L. Gardiner
 Dr G. A. Holmes
 Professor R. A. Markus
 Professor P. H. Matthews
 Professor K. R. Norman
 Professor J. R. Pole
 Professor S. J. Prais
 Professor B. S. Pullan
 Professor B. B. Shefton
 Professor H. S. Smith
 Professor E. G. Stanley
M. Tregear
 Professor J. E. Varey
G. Vermes

1986 
The following fellows of the British Academy were elected at the annual general meeting in 1986:
 Professor K. R. Andrews
 Professor G. W. Brown
 Professor J. A. Burrow
 Professor J. W. Burrow
 Professor P. W. Edwards
J. Griffin
 Dr G. L. Harriss
 Professor E. J. A. Henderson
 Professor I. R. J. Jack
 Dr P. N. Johnson-Laird
 Dr J. P. C. Kent
 Professor I. M. Lewis
 Professor D. E. Luscombe
 Professor D. N. MacCormick
 Dr A. D. J. Macfarlane
 Professor D. F. McKenzie
 Professor H. G. T. Maehler
 Dr J. I. R. Montagu
 D. A. Parfit
 Professor R. H. Robins
 Professor A. J. Ryan
 Professor R. B. Serjeant
 Professor G. Williams
 Professor J. J. Wilkes
 Professor D. N. Winch
 Professor T. P. Wiseman

1987 
The following fellows of the British Academy were elected at the annual general meeting in 1987:
J. Barnes
 Professor D. J. Bartholomew
 Professor P. Boyde
J. M. Budden
 Professor D. A. Davie
 Professor R. R. Davies
 Dr A. C. de la Mare
The Lord Goff of Chieveley
 Professor K. H. D. Haley
 Dr R. J. Hayward
 Professor D. F. Hendry
J. G. Hurst
 Professor C. M. Kauffmann
 Professor K. H. Kuhn
 Professor G. N. Leech
 Professor G. C. Lepschy
 Dr Steven Lukes
 Professor A. S. Milward
 Rev. Professor E. W. Nicholson
 Professor J. Raz
T. J. Reed
L. D. Reynolds
 Professor P. J. Rhodes
 Professor A. M. Strathern
 Professor B. E. Supple

1988 
The following fellows of the British Academy were elected at the annual general meeting in 1988:
 Professor M. J. Artis
 Professor B. M. Barry
 Dr C. J. Bliss
 Professor J. M. Crook
 Professor J. H. R. Davis
 Professor A. D. Deyermond
 Dr P. G. M. Dickson
 Professor R. B. Dobson
 Professor E. B. Fryde
 Professor G. M. J. Gazdar
 Professor R. M. Goode
 Rt Rev.. Professor R. P. C. Hanson
 Dr A. M. Hudson
 Professor G. Jahoda
 Dr S. C. Levinson
 J. R. Lucas
 Dr P. G. Mackesy
 Professor D. P. O'Brien
 M. R. Popham
 Dr R. D. F. Pring-Mill
 Professor T. O. Ranger
 E. D. Rawson
 F. M. B. Reynolds
 Dr J. M. Rogers
 Dr R. S. Schofield
 Dr N. J. Sims-Williams
 Professor T. C. Smout
 Professor A. H. Woolrych

1989 
The following fellows of the British Academy were elected at the annual general meeting in 1989:

 Professor M. Anderson
 Professor D. E. D. Beales
 Professor P. H. Birks
 Dr C. Blacker
 Professor M. Blaug
 Professor N. P. Brooks
 Dr P. F. Clarke
 Professor A. G. Cross
 Professor P. S. Dasgupta
 Professor M. Douglas
 Professor J. M. Dunn
 Professor A. M. Everitt
 Professor R. F. Foster
 Professor P. France
 Professor D. Gray
 Professor E. A. J. Honigmann
 Dr J. Iliffe
 Professor R. M. Kempson
 Professor M. A. Knibb
 Professor G. E. Rickman
 Professor E. P. Sanders
 Professor R. R. K. Sorabji
 Professor A. C. Thomas
 Dr J. D. Thomas
 Professor P. J. Trudgill
 Dr C. J. White
 Dr M. Williams

Senior fellows 
 Professor D. Black
 Dr E. J. M. Bowlby
 Professor H. Jenkins
 Professor H. G. Koenigsberger
 Professor A. McIntosh
 Professor W. S. Watt
 Professor B. Woledge

References